Union Hill is an unincorporated community in Buckingham County, Virginia, that was founded by freed slaves after the American Civil War.

On January 7, 2020, the US Fourth Circuit Court of Appeals rejected a permit for a fracked gas pipeline air compressor station in Union Hill to serve the Atlantic Coast Pipeline, on the grounds that concerns about impacts on the historic African American community had not been adequately addressed per the Virginia Environmental Justice Act.

References

Unincorporated communities in Virginia
Unincorporated communities in Buckingham County, Virginia